Joshua Wayne Rabe (born October 15, 1978) is a former Major League Baseball outfielder with the Minnesota Twins and current head baseball coach for Quincy University in Quincy, Illinois.

Quincy University
Rabe played baseball, basketball and football at Unity High School in Mendon, Illinois, where he later graduated. He’s the school’s all-time leader in hits (212), doubles (48) and runs (170). He’s second all-time in home runs (32) and third in batting average (.377) and runs batted in (147).

Minor leagues
Rabe was drafted by the Twins in the eleventh round of the 2000 Major League Baseball Draft. In his first professional season, Rabe batted .221 with a .977 fielding percentage for the Elizabethton Twins. A year later, with the Quad Cities River Bandits, he improved in both departments, batting .282 with six home runs and a .981 fielding percentage while playing all three outfield positions.

In half a season in Fort Myers, he batted .340 with five home runs and 40 RBIs to be named to the Florida State League Western division All-Star team, and was promoted to the double A New Britain Rock Cats. In , with the Rochester Red Wings, Rabe earned his third minor league All-Star nod, and a promotion up to the Twins. While with Rochester, he also volunteered his time at a clinics at Penfield Little League.

Minnesota Twins
Rabe made his major league debut for the Twins on July 17, as a pinch runner for Jason Kubel in the eighth inning at the Hubert H. Humphrey Metrodome. He recorded his first Major League hit the following day against Edwin Jackson of the Tampa Bay Devil Rays.

Rabe recorded a three hit game July 27, 2006, against the Chicago White Sox, going 3-for-5 with three singles. Perhaps the finest game of his brief major league career occurred against the Detroit Tigers two days later, when Rabe went 2-for-3, hitting his first major league home run (a two run shot off Nate Robertson), and recorded four put outs in left field.

For the season, Rabe batted .286 with three home runs and seven RBIs. He started the  season with the Twins, but a shoulder injury limited Rabe to only fourteen games, in which he batted .194 with no home runs and only two RBIs. He was released at the end of the season.

Camden Riversharks
The Baltimore Orioles and Yomiuri Giants of the Japanese Baseball League both showed interest in Rabe, but he eventually ended up signing with the Camden Riversharks of the independent Atlantic League on March 31, . He batted .361 with six home runs and thirty RBIs during his time with Camden before back injuries forced him into early retirement on June 24, 2008.

References

External links

1978 births
Living people
Major League Baseball designated hitters
Major League Baseball outfielders
Minnesota Twins players
Rochester Red Wings players
Camden Riversharks players
Quincy Hawks athletic directors
Quincy Hawks baseball coaches
Quincy Hawks baseball players
Elizabethton Twins players
Fort Myers Miracle players
New Britain Rock Cats players
Quad Cities River Bandits players
Sportspeople from Quincy, Illinois
Baseball coaches from Illinois
Baseball players from Illinois